Pete Sampras was the defending champion and successfully defended his title, beating Cédric Pioline 7–6(7–5), 1–6, 7–5 in the final.

Seeds

Draw

Finals

Top half

Bottom half

References

 Main Draw

1993 ATP Tour